Suillus triacicularis is a species of bolete fungus in the family Suillaceae. Described as new to science in 2014, it is found in the northwestern Himalayas, India, where it grows in association with Pinus roxburghii.

References

External links

tridentinus
Fungi described in 2014
Fungi of India